Inquiry: The Journal of Health Care Organization Provision and Financing is a peer-reviewed healthcare journal covering public policy issues, innovative concepts, and original research in healthcare provision.

Abstracting and indexing 
The journal is abstracted and indexed in PubMed/MEDLINE, Science Citation Index, Social Sciences Citation Index, Current Contents/Social & Behavioral Sciences, and Current Contents/Clinical Medicine. According to the Journal Citation Reports, the journal has a 2021 impact factor of 2.099.

References

External links 
 

Public health journals
Hybrid open access journals
Quarterly journals
English-language journals
Publications established in 1964